Kinga Zsigmond (born 19 April 1964 in Budapest) is a retired female javelin thrower from Hungary. She represented her native country at the 1992 Summer Olympics, finishing in tenth place in the final rankings. She set her personal best (63.90 metres) in 1992.

Achievements

Awards
 Hungarian athlete of the Year (1): 1992

References
  sports-reference

1964 births
Living people
Hungarian female javelin throwers
Athletes (track and field) at the 1992 Summer Olympics
Olympic athletes of Hungary
Athletes from Budapest